Mocímboa da Praia Airport  is an airport in Mocímboa da Praia, Mocímboa da Praia District, in the Cabo Delgado Province of Mozambique.

References 

Buildings and structures in Cabo Delgado Province
Airports in Mozambique